McCrea may refer to:

Places
McCrea, Louisiana
McCrea Heights, Ontario
McCrea Township, Minnesota

Other
 Clan Macrae, a Highland Scottish clan
 Joel McCrea (1905–1990), American actor
 Michael McCrea (born c.  1958), British convicted killer and former financial adviser